Rajko Milošević a.k.a. Gera and R. M. Guéra (November 24, 1959) is a Serbian comic book author and illustrator. He lives in Barcelona, Spain since 1991.

He debuted in the Yugoslav comic book industry in 1982 with the series Elmer Jones, a Leonesque western scripted by Dragan Savić (writer). They later collaborated on Texas Riders in 1984. 

R. M. Gera's work has been published in Spain, France and the United States. He worked on the Vertigo Comics series Scalped, with writer Jason Aaron, as well as on Le Lievre de Mars, with writer Patrick Cothias for French publisher Glénat.

Géra is a childhood nickname, and not part of his real name. He changed it to Guéra in the early 1990s when he moved to Barcelona, Spain, to adapt it to Spanish pronunciation.

References

External links
 Rajko Milošević on Lambiek Comiclopedia.
 Guéra's official website
 Scalped website
 RM Guéra: Creator with a Heart, an interview, Broken fontier, Jan 25, 2012
 R.M. Guera Takes On Tarantino's "Django Unchained", Comicbook resources, Sep 12th, 2012
 Exposition Django Unchained, on Cinechronicle.com

1959 births
Living people
Artists from Belgrade
Serbian comics writers
Serbian comics artists
Serbian illustrators